The de Marçay 2 C1 was a single seat biplane fighter designed in France and first flown in 1919.  It did not go into production.

Design and development

The de Marçay 2 was designed at the end of World War I and flew early in 1919. It was a single bay sesquiplane with low aspect ratio, rectangular plan wings mounted with stagger. On each side a parallel pair of forward-leaning interplane struts defined the bays, with another, outward-leaning pair rooted at their base to brace the overhang of the upper wing.  The centre of the latter was attached to the upper fuselage by short cabane struts. Only the upper wings carried ailerons; these narrowed in chord outward before rapidly widening at their tips to form horn balances.

The fighter's fuselage was flat sided, though with rounded upper and lower decking. The original intention was fit a Liberty L-8 V-8 engine but problems with this model led to the installation of a  Hispano-Suiza 8Fb, also a V-8.  A pair of fixed, synchronized  Vickers machine guns fired through the propeller disc. The pilot's open cockpit placed him at the trailing edge of the upper wing, which had a deep cut-out to improve his upward field of view; the lower wings had smaller cut-outs for downward vision.

The empennage of the de Marçay was conventional, with a triangular tailplane and semi-elliptical elevator mounted on top of the fuselage.  The broad chord fin was also triangular, with a rounded rudder which went down to the keel, operating between the elevators. It had a fixed, tailskid undercarriage with its mainwheels on a single axle which was rubber sprung to a transverse cross brace between two pairs of V-struts from the lower fuselage.

Piloted by Lebeau, the de Marçay 2 took part in the C1 or single seat fighter category of the 1919 Service Aéronautique competition held at Villacoublay. Though it was the fastest aircraft there, the Nieuport 29 was awarded a production contract and no more de Marçay 2s were built. The lone prototype was advertised for sale by SAECA Edmund de Marçay through most of 1920, though its ultimate fate is not recorded.

Variants
de Marçay 1 C1 A single-seat fighter, as originally designed in 1918, powered by a  Liberty L-12; not built.
de Marçay 2 C1The de Marçay 1 re-designed to accommodate a  {{Hispano=Suiza 8Fb]]; one built.

Specifications (de Marçay 2)

References

1910s French fighter aircraft
002
Single-engined tractor aircraft
Sesquiplanes
Aircraft first flown in 1919